Rick is a masculine given name, often a short form (hypocorism) of Richard, Derek, Frederick or Patrick. It may refer to:

People
 Rick Adams (disambiguation)
 Rick Astley (born 1966), British singer
 Rick W. Allen (born 1951), American politician
 Rick Anderson (disambiguation)
 Rick Benjamin (disambiguation)
 Rick Berman (born 1945), American television producer, executive producer of several Star Trek series
 Rick Berns (born 1956), National Football League player
 Rick Danko (1942–1999), Canadian musician, singer and songwriter, member of The Band
 Rick Dees (born 1960), American radio personality and comedian who wrote and sang the #1 hit "Disco Duck"
 Rick DeVecchi (1961–1998), American murder victim
 Rick Duncan (American football) (born 1941), American football player
 Rick Flens (born 1983), Dutch road bicycle racer 
 Rick Fraser (disambiguation)
 Rick Henderson (1928–2004), American jazz saxophonist and arranger
 Rick Harrison, American television personality and pawn shop owner
 Rick Hoffman (born 1970), American actor
 Rick Jackson (born 1989), American basketball player
 Rick James (1948–2004), American singer-songwriter, multi-instrumentalist and record producer
 Rick James (baseball) (born 1947), American baseball player
 Rick Johnson (disambiguation)
 Rick Jones (disambiguation)
 Rick Kelly (born 1983), Australian racing driver
 Rick Lackman (1910-1990), American football player
 Rick Lax (born 1982), American entertainer 
 Rick Leonard (born 1996), American football player
 Rick Lyle (born 1971), American football player
 Rick Mazza (born 1961), Australian politician
 Rick Middleton (born 1953), Canadian retired National Hockey League player
 Rick Middleton (American football) (born 1951), American former National Football League player
 Rick Miller (baseball) (born 1948), American Major League Baseball player
 Rick Miller (Canadian politician) (born 1960), Canadian politician
 Rick Miller (comedian), Canadian comedian and presenter of the US television series Just for Laughs
 Rick Miller (speedway rider) (born 1961), American former international motorcycle speedway rider
 Rick Miller (Texas politician) (born 1946), American politician and retired United States Navy officer
 Rick Morocco (born 1963), Canadian-Italian ice hockey executive and former professional player
 Rick Nielsen (born 1946), lead guitarist, backing vocalist and primary songwriter of the rock band Cheap Trick
 Rick Olson (Iowa politician) (born 1951), Iowa state representative
 Rick Olson (Michigan politician) (born 1949), member of the Michigan House of Representatives
 Rick Paterson (born 1958), Canadian former National Hockey League player and coach
 Rick Pitino, American basketball coach
 Rick Razzano (linebacker) (born 1955), National Football League player
 Rick Reed (pitcher) (born 1964), American Major League Baseball pitcher
 Rick Reinert (1925-2018), American animator, founder of Rick Reinert Productions
 Rick Roberts (disambiguation)
 Rick Rude, ring name of American professional wrestler Richard Rood (1958-1999)
 Rick Salomon (born c. 1968), American poker player mostly known for his relationships with various female celebrities
 Rick Sanford (born 1957), National Football League player
 Rick Santorum (born 1958), American politician and lawyer, 2012 presidential candidate
 Rick Sawatsky (born 1976), Canadian curler
 Rick Schwartz (born 1967), American film and television producer
 Rick Scott (born 1952), American politician
 Rick Smith (disambiguation)
 Rick Stein (born 1947), English celebrity chef, restaurateur and television presenter
 Rick Steiner (born 1961), ring name of American professional wrestler Robert Rechsteiner
 Rick Steves (born 1955), American author and travel television personality
 Rick Sutcliffe (born 1956), American retired Major League Baseball pitcher and broadcaster
 Rick Wakeman, English keyboardist (Yes)
 Rick Walker (born 1955), American retired National Football League player and radio sports commentator
 Rick White (disambiguation)
 Rick Williams (disambiguation)
 Rick Wilson (basketball) (born 1956), American basketball player
 Rick Wilson (ice hockey) (born 1950), Canadian ice hockey player and coach
 Rick Wilson (jockey) (born 1954), American jockey
 Rick Wilson (racing driver) (born 1953), American NASCAR driver
 Rick Wilson (wrestler) (1965–1999), American professional wrestler best known as The Renegade in World Championship Wrestling
 Rick Youngblood, American politician elected to the Idaho House of Representatives in 2012
 Rick Yune (born 1971), American actor
 Rick Zabel (born 1993), German road bicycle racer

Fictional characters
 Rick, a character in the 1993 American action movie Falling Down
 Rick, from Nintendo's Kirby Series
 Rick Alessi, on the Australian soap opera Neighbours
 Rick Benton / the Gladiator, the main character in the 1986 TV action movie The Gladiator
 Rick Blaine, hero of the film Casablanca, played by Humphrey Bogart
 Rick Bruiser, one of the final two opponents in Super NES video game Super Punch-Out!!
 Rick Grimes, the main character of the Walking Dead comic book series and its television adaptation of the same name
 Rick Jones (comics), sidekick of several Marvel Comics superheroes
 Rick Marshall, a character in 1974 TV series The Land of the Lost
 Rick Payne, a character from the Ghost Whisperer
 Rick Sanchez, a main character of the animated television series Rick and Morty
 Rick Sanchez, a main character of the animated television series Robot Chicken
 Richard Bluedhorn "Rick" or "Ricky" Stratton, the main character in the American TV sitcom Silver Spoons
 Rick Wlodimierz, a character in the Netflix series 13 Reasons Why
 Ranger Rick Raccoon, mascot and character from the National Wildlife Federation's Ranger Rick magazine

See also
Rich (given name)
Richard
Ricky (given name)
Rik (given name)

Masculine given names
Hypocorisms
English masculine given names